The 2008 Mesa mayoral election was held on May 20, 2008, to elect the mayor of Mesa, Arizona. It saw the election of Scott Smith.

Incumbent mayor Keno Hawker was term limited.

Results

Primary
The primary was held March 11, 2008.

General election

References 

2008
Mesa
Mesa